ROKS Dokdo (LPH-6111) is the lead ship of the  of the Republic of Korea Navy, launched on 12 July 2005 at the shipyard of Hanjin Heavy Industries & Constructions Co. in Busan. ROKS Dokdo was the flagship of the Fifth Component Flotilla of the Korean Navy until the launch of ROKS Marado in 2018. Previously, this title was held by the 9,000-ton at-sea Underway Replenishment (UNREP) support vessel .

Naming

The name Dokdo comes from the Korean name for the Liancourt Rocks, a group of islets in the Donghae that are currently administered by South Korea. The islets' ownership is disputed between Japan and South Korea.  The Japanese Ministry of Foreign Affairs expressed its regret over the naming of Dokdo.

ROKS Dokdo was commissioned into the ROK Navy on 3 July 2007.

History
In March 2010, Dokdo assisted in search and rescue operations after the sinking of ROKS Cheonan. In July, the ship took part in  Operation Invincible Spirit, a joint alliance exercise.

See also
 
 
 
 Project 23900 amphibious assault ship

References

External links

 Globalsecurity article on the LP-X

Dokdo-class amphibious assault ships
Ships built by Hanjin Heavy Industries
2005 ships